Tmesisternus vinculatus is a species of beetle in the family Cerambycidae. It was described by Karl Borromaeus Maria Josef Heller in 1914.

References

vinculatus
Beetles described in 1914